, also known by the shorthand  and , is a Japanese light novel series written by Sou Sagara and illustrated by Kantoku. Media Factory published 13 volumes from October 2010 to March 2019. It was adapted into a manga series serialized in Monthly Comic Alive and a 12-episode anime television series by J.C.Staff, which aired from April to June 2013. The anime is licensed by Sentai Filmworks in North America.

Plot
Yōto Yokodera is a second-year high school student who is arguably the biggest pervert at school. His problem is that he is not good at showing his real emotions. One day, his equally perverted best friend completely transforms and gets rid of his "impure thoughts"; a feat he attributes to the power of the statue of the "Stony Cat". As the rumors suggest, by wishing upon the statue and giving it an offering, one can wish to remove a personality trait from themselves that one does not wish to have anymore. However, this will remove the unwanted trait and give it to someone who does need it.

As Yōto is making his offering to the statue, a girl named Tsukiko Tsutsukakushi arrives to make her wish to be able to be more like an adult and not show her emotions so easily. Both of them wish upon the stony cat and to their surprise the next day at school, Yōto is unable to tell a single lie, and Tsukiko is unable to show any sign of emotion whatsoever. After realizing that they do not like the change that happened, they work together to try to find out who has received their trait that was taken away in order to get it back. They meet Azusa Azuki, an attractive second-year girl who has just transferred into their school. She is always being confessed to by many boys in school, but she has no friends and is always alone. Yōto finds out that Azusa is the one that received his unwanted personality trait and tries to get it back. As the two try to get back the unwanted trait, they develop feelings for each other.

Characters

Main characters

Yōto is the main protagonist and a second-year in high school. He is secretly a huge pervert, yet because he is unable to say what's on his mind and so cannot truly express his inner self, his deeds are always misunderstood. He even joined the athletics club to be able to watch the girls in swimsuits. One night he heads to the Stony Cat statue to wish for it to take away his façade, since it's getting in the way of his life. However, it isn't until the Stony Cat statue grants his wish that he starts to get into trouble. The Stony Cat statue granted his wish literally, so, for a time, he lost his 'façade' (tatemae) but found that life wasn't as he had imagined it would be. He began to say everything on his mind, including all of his perverted thoughts, causing him to receive the nickname the 'Pervert Prince'. He later returns to the Stony Cat statue to recover his façade from Azusa (who had gained it). Nevertheless, over time, he becomes closer to Tsukiko, Azusa, and Tsukushi.
It is revealed that several years previously he gave up his memories of his time with Tsukasa to the Tsutsukakushi sisters so that they would have memories of their mother. He develops feelings for Tsukiko.

Tsukiko is a first-year student at Yōto's high school. She shows her emotions easily and goes to the Stony Cat statue where she wishes to become more mature and less open with her emotions. The Stony Cat statue takes her words literally, and as a result, she has become unable to express any emotions on her face, regardless of the situation.
Despite Yōto's occasional perverted actions, she develops feelings for him and hopes for an advantage over the other girls who pursue him. After knowing that Yōto can't have long term memory, she prepared a diary and claimed to remember everything for him.

Azusa is a second-year high school student and a very popular girl, despite being flat-chested. She is a loner and has rejected all of the confessions she has received. She likes animals and tends to include bizarre animal similes in conversation. As a result of Yōto's wish on the Stony Cat statue, she temporarily becomes unable to express her honest feelings. While she pretends to be a rich elite, she actually lives in a small apartment and keeps several jobs in a neighboring town in order to be able to afford the act. Before she transferred, she was outcast and bullied in her old school; this ultimately led to her losing trust in people. After Yōto regains his façade, she begins to open up to those around her including Yōto for whom she starts to develop feelings. At his urging she reconciles with Morii and Moriya, her former friends from her old school to help her in her desperateness.

In the beginning of the story, she admires Yōto for his eagerness to join the club, and even believes him to act as a pervert because he is under too much pressure. She is deeply in love with her little sister Tsukiko, to the point that she wants to marry her. She confronts Yōto about his relationship with her sister and believes his lie that the person associating with Tsukiko is his "younger identical twin". She eventually falls in love with "Yōto's brother", still unaware of the truth, and decides that they should move to a place where polygamy is legal so that "he" can marry both her and her little sister which Yōto cannot handle.
 

Emi is a young Italian girl whom Yōto met in the past. Due to her wish on the Stony Cat statue, she temporarily acts as Ponta's sister who came back from Italy. Similarly to Azusa, Emi frequently uses strange analogies in conversation, only she uses plant similes such as calling someone a "stupid pumpkin". Her father seems to have some kind of relationship with Tsukiko's father.

Other characters

Ponta is Yōto's best childhood friend. He told Yōto about the power of the 'Stony Cat' after he himself lost his perverseness because of its power and became a selfless person who engaged in humanitarianism.

Mai is the vice president of the athletics club. She admires Tsukushi and wants to be her successor. This puts her at odds with Yōto, who is another candidate for the next club president. Her personality is cold and harsh, which isolates her from others. She is actually jealous of Yōto's ability to make friends easily and they eventually form a platonic friendship. It is hinted that she is more perverted than Yōto. She used to be friend with Azusa when they were young.
 
 (Morii), Aya Suzaki (Moriya)
Morii and Moriya are Azusa's friends from junior-high school. They used to tease her, but were merely trying to be friendly. Azusa makes up with them after Yōto convinces them to apologize for being friendly the wrong way. They believe that Yōto and Azusa are a couple. They both often say the word "like" between words with no particular reason.

Tsukasa was the mother of Tsukiko and Tsukushi, who died when they were young due to complications from an infection caused by a flood. She was a very nice person, although she sometimes sounded mean. Following her husband's death, she had her daughters move to Italy and live with her husband's parents due to her poor health. This caused a rift to form between her and Tsukushi, who believed that her mother had abandoned her and Tsukiko. While living alone, Tsukasa handmade clothes for both Tsukiko and Tsukushi, and also took care of Yōto, who would keep her company. Tsukasa was reunited with her daughters prior to her death.

Azusa's mother, who is a very kind person and loves turtles.

The Stony Cat (also known as the Cat God) is the entity that has been worshiped by the Tsutsukakushi family for generation. It has the ability to grant and revert wishes. It also has the ability to possess people or animals, as shown when it possesses both Azusa and Ponta's rabbit. The Cat God speaks in a female voice.

Media

Light novels
The "Hentai" Prince and the Stony Cat. is a light novel series written by Sou Sagara, with illustrations by Kantoku. Media Factory published 13 volumes from October 25, 2010 to March 25, 2019. A drama CD was bundled with a special edition of the sixth light novel volume.

Manga
A manga adaptation, illustrated by Okomeken, was serialized in Media Factory's Monthly Comic Alive magazine from the June 2011 issue to the April 2018 issue. Media Factory published the series in eight tankōbon volumes from August 23, 2011 to March 23, 2018. It was licensed in English by Digital Manga, who released the first three volumes between October 2012 and October 2014. A spin-off manga titled , illustrated by Kashi, was released in a single volume on March 23, 2013.

Anime
A 12-episode anime television series adaptation produced by J.C.Staff, written by Michiko Itou, and directed by Yōhei Suzuki aired between April 13 and June 29, 2013. It was also simulcast by Crunchyroll. The opening theme is "Fantastic Future" by Yukari Tamura and the ending theme is "Baby Sweet Berry Love" by Yui Ogura. The anime is licensed by Sentai Filmworks in North America, and it was released digitally and on home video on June 3, 2014.

Reception
The manga sold 22,076 copies in the week of August 22 to August 28, 2011.

References

External links
Light novel official website 
Anime official website 

2010 Japanese novels
2011 manga
2013 anime television series debuts
Anime and manga based on light novels
Digital Manga Publishing titles
Harem anime and manga
J.C.Staff
Light novels
Madman Entertainment anime
Media Factory manga
MF Bunko J
Kadokawa Dwango franchises
Romantic comedy anime and manga
Seinen manga
Sentai Filmworks